The 2014–15 Albanian Women's National Championship was the 6th season of women's league football under the Albanian Football Association.

The League was won by Vllaznia Shkodër, its second consecutive title. By winning, Vllaznia qualified to 2015–16 UEFA Women's Champions League.

Teams

League table

References

External links
Kampionati Federata Shqiptare E Futbollit 
Albanian Women's Football Championship 2014/15 UEFA.com

Albania
Women's National Championship
Albanian Women's National Championship seasons